Cardinal O'Brien may refer to:

 Edwin Frederick O'Brien (born 1939), American cardinal, Grand Master of the Order of the Holy Sepulchre and Archbishop of Baltimore
 Keith O'Brien (1938–2018), Scottish cardinal and Archbishop of St Andrews and Edinburgh